This Is Not What You Had Planned is the 2nd mini-album from Reading singer-songwriter Ben Marwood, released on 4 August 2008 via Broken Tail Records. In November 2008, "Five Little Secrets" was selected as Times Online's 'track of the day'.

Critical reception

The album has gathered favourable reviews, with critics praising Marwood's "rare lyrical and musical grace" and "intelligently quirky lyrics".

Track listing
 "Question Marks" - 2:12
 "Five Little Secrets" - 3:49
 "I Know What I Did Last Summer" - 3:10
 "Heathens" - 3:33
 "Claire" - 3:18
 "Fake It" - 2:22
 "Like It or Not" 3:14

References

2008 albums